The John Seward House in Franklin, Tennessee, United States, was listed on the National Register of Historic Places in 1988.  It has also been known as Seward Hall.  It includes Greek Revival and Central passage plan architecture.  It's a brick residence.  Like the Thomas Holt House and the James Sayers House, also NRHP-listed, it has a main entrance with Greek Revival details, including a two-story portico.

References

Central-passage houses in Tennessee
Greek Revival houses in Tennessee
Houses completed in 1847
Houses in Franklin, Tennessee
Houses on the National Register of Historic Places in Tennessee
1847 establishments in Tennessee
National Register of Historic Places in Williamson County, Tennessee